"Ruthless for Life" is the first single from rapper MC Ren's third studio album, Ruthless for Life. The song is dedicated to late rapper and former N.W.A. groupmate, Eazy-E. "Ruthless for Life" charted at 13 on U.S. Rap and 61 on the U.S. R&B. It is produced by L.T. Hutton.

Single track listing

A-Side
"Ruthless for Life" (LP Version) – 4:22  
"Ruthless for Life" (LP A Cappella) – 4:02

B-Side
"Ruthless for Life" (Clean Radio Edit) – 3:40  
"Ruthless for Life" (Instrumental) – 4:22

Charts

References

Ruthless Records singles
Songs written by MC Ren
1998 singles
MC Ren songs
Gangsta rap songs
Song recordings produced by L.T. Hutton
1998 songs